Acrolepia aleuritis is a moth of the family Acrolepiidae. It was described by Edward Meyrick in 1913. It is found in Sri Lanka.

References

Moths described in 1913
Acrolepiidae